These are the U.S. number-one albums of 2010 on the Billboard 200, as per Billboard.

Note that Billboard publishes charts with an issue date approximately 7–10 days in advance.

The seventh studio album by American rapper Eminem, Recovery, was the best selling album of 2010 and spent the most time at number one in the year, a total seven weeks. Scottish singer Susan Boyle also spent 7 weeks topping the chart, but with two albums, 2009's I Dreamed A Dream and 2010's The Gift. American country singer-songwriter Taylor Swift's third studio album, Speak Now, opened with more than 1.08 million copies sold in its first week, becoming the first country album to do so.

Chart history

References 

2010
United States Albums